Line Drost Christophersen (born 14 January 2000) is a Danish badminton player. She once trained at the Skælskør club, and now belongs to Gentofte. Christophersen won the girls' singles title at the 2018 European Junior Championships, and the silver medal at the World Junior Championships, and then won a silver medal at the 2021 European Championships in the women's singles event. She was part of the team from Denmark that won the 2020 European Women's Team Championships, and at the 2021 and 2023 European Mixed Team Championships.

Achievements

European Championships 
Women's singles

World Junior Championships 
Girls' singles

European Junior Championships 
Girls' singles

BWF World Tour (3 runners-up) 
The BWF World Tour, which was announced on 19 March 2017 and implemented in 2018, is a series of elite badminton tournaments sanctioned by the Badminton World Federation (BWF). The BWF World Tour is divided into levels of World Tour Finals, Super 1000, Super 750, Super 500, Super 300 (part of the HSBC World Tour), and the BWF Tour Super 100.

Women's singles

BWF International Challenge/Series (3 titles, 1 runner-up) 
Women's singles

  BWF International Challenge tournament
  BWF International Series tournament
  BWF Future Series tournament

BWF Junior International (1 title, 1 runner-up) 
Girls' singles

  BWF Junior International Grand Prix tournament
  BWF Junior International Challenge tournament
  BWF Junior International Series tournament
  BWF Junior Future Series tournament

References

External links 
 

2000 births
Living people
People from Sorø Municipality
Danish female badminton players
Sportspeople from Region Zealand
21st-century Danish women